Bracamontes is a Spanish surname and may refer to:

Carlos Bracamontes (born 1959), Mexican football manager and former player
Jacqueline Bracamontes (born 1979), Mexican actress and model
Jesús Bracamontes (born 1951), Mexican soccer coach
Luis Bracamontes (born 1970), Mexican murderer of American police officers 

Spanish-language surnames